A list of prime ministers of the United Kingdom and the educational institutions they attended.
, of the 57 prime ministers to date, 30 were educated at the University of Oxford (including 13 at Christ Church), and 14 at the University of Cambridge (including six at Trinity College). Three attended the University of Edinburgh, three the University of Glasgow, and two Mason Science College, a predecessor institution of the University of Birmingham. John Major was (as of ) the last of the eight prime ministers who did not attend university after leaving secondary education. A number of the prime ministers who attended university never graduated. Oxford gained its 29th prime-ministerial alumnus when Liz Truss (PPE, Merton College) succeeded Boris Johnson in September 2022 and its 30th a month later in Rishi Sunak.

Twenty prime ministers were schooled at Eton College, of whom nine were educated at Eton and Christ Church, Oxford, including all three who held office between 1880 and 1902 (Gladstone, Salisbury, Rosebery). Seven were educated at Harrow School and six at Westminster School. Eleven prime ministers to date have been educated at only non-fee-paying schools; these include all five who held office between 1964 and 1997 (Wilson, Heath, Callaghan, Thatcher, Major). Theresa May was educated at both independent and grammar schools. Three did not receive (primary or secondary) school education and were homeschooled during childhood.

Fifteen prime ministers trained as barristers at the Inns of Court, including 12 at Lincoln's Inn (although not all were called to the bar). Two (Wellington and Churchill) completed officer training at military academies.

Although William Pulteney, 1st Earl of Bath (in 1746) and James Waldegrave, 2nd Earl Waldegrave (in 1757) briefly attempted to form governments, neither is usually counted as Prime Minister. They are not listed below.

List of British prime ministers by education

See also
 List of presidents of the United States by education
 List of prime ministers of Australia by education
 List of prime ministers of Canada by academic degrees
 List of presidents of the Philippines by education

References 

United Kingdom 
Education
United Kingdom education-related lists